Devi Sri Prasad is an Indian composer, lyricist, singer-songwriter, and performer. He has provided musical scores predominantly for Telugu films apart from a few films in other Indian languages. Although his earlier soundtrack albums received wide response, his compositions in the 2004 Telugu film Varsham fetched him awards for the first time in his career. These include a CineMAA Award for Best Music Director, Santosham Best Music Director and  Filmfare Award for Best Music Director – Telugu.

Apart from soundtrack composition, he also received awards for film scoring, playback singing and lyrics composition. He performed in various music concerts. His 2012 release Gabbar Singh, received huge response both from audience and critics. Devi received several awards for the soundtrack album. "Kevvu Keka" song from the album received cult status over the years. In 2021, the album is honored with Album of the Decade award at 11th Mirchi Music Awards South.

As of 2019, Devi Sri Prasad has nine Filmfare South awards, nine Mirchi Music awards, nine CineMAA awards, seven GAMA awards and SIIMA awards. He received most of his awards and nominations for his compositions in the films Nuvvostanante Nenoddantana, Arya 2, Attarintiki Daredi, S/O Satyamurthy, Srimanthudu, Nannaku Prematho and Rangasthalam. Since many years he has been also one of the highest-paid music composers in Tollywood.

CineMAA Awards

Filmfare Awards South

Gulf Andhra Music Awards (GAMA Tollywood Awards)

Hyderabad Times Film Awards

IIFA Utsavam

International Tamil Film Awards

Maa Music Awards

Mirchi Music Awards South

Nandi Awards

Radio City Cine Awards

Sakshi Excellence Awards

Santosham Film Awards

South Indian International Movie Awards

South Scope Lifestyle Awards

TSR– TV9 National Film Awards

Vijay Awards

Vijay Music Awards

Zee Cine Awards Telugu

Other Awards and recognitions 

 2009: Sitara Awards  –  Special Award for Best Music Director (for Jalsa and Ready)
2009: Isai Aruvi Tamil Music Awards – Best Music Director (for Kanthaswamy)
2013: Audi Ritz Icon Awards
2013: Big Telugu Entertainment Awards – Best Music Director (for Attarintiki Daredi)
 2016: Sri Kala Sudha Telugu Association 18th Ugadi Purakaskaralu – Best Music Director
2017: Zee Golden Awards – Best Music Director (for Khaidi No. 150 and DJ: Duvvada Jagannadham)
2017: Nominated for Best Music Director (for Khaidi No. 150, Jai Lava Kusa and DJ: Duvvada Jagannadham) at Mango Telugu Cinema Awards 2017

References 

Lists of awards received by Indian musician
Awards